Greendale is a city in Dearborn County, Indiana, United States. The population was 4,520 at the 2010 census.

History
Greendale was laid out in 1852, but the plat was not recorded until 1883. Greendale likely took its name from Greendale Cemetery.

Geography
Greendale is located at  (39.121438, -84.853937).

Demographics

2010 census
As of the census of 2010, there were 4,520 people, 1,809 households, and 1,241 families living in the city. The racial makeup of the city was 95.6% White, 1.0% African American, 0.2% Native American, 0.8% Asian, 0.6% from other races, and 1.8% from two or more races. Hispanic or Latino of any race were 1.6% of the population.

There were 1,809 households, of which 33.1% had children under the age of 18 living with them, 49.9% were married couples living together, 12.8% had a female householder with no husband present, 5.9% had a male householder with no wife present, and 31.4% were non-families. 27.1% of all households were made up of individuals, and 12.6% had someone living alone who was 65 years of age or older. The average household size was 2.50 and the average family size was 3.02.

The median age in the city was 40.1 years. 24.4% of residents were under the age of 18; 6.9% were between the ages of 18 and 24; 25% were from 25 to 44; 28.4% were from 45 to 64; and 15.3% were 65 years of age or older. The gender makeup of the city was 47.8% male and 52.2% female.

2000 census
As of the census of 2000, there were 4,296 people, 1,781 households, and 1,212 families living in the city. The racial makeup of the city was 97.91% White, 0.58% African American, 0.07% Native American, 0.49% Asian, 0.02% from other races, and 0.93% from two or more races. Hispanic or Latino of any race were 0.33% of the population.

There were 1,781 households, out of which 29.4% had children under the age of 18 living with them, 53.2% were married couples living together, 10.9% had a female householder with no husband present, and 31.9% were non-families. 27.8% of all households were made up of individuals, and 14.2% had someone living alone who was 65 years of age or older. The average household size was 2.41 and the average family size was 2.95.

In the city, the population was spread out, with 23.2% under the age of 18, 7.4% from 18 to 24, 28.3% from 25 to 44, 25.0% from 45 to 64, and 16.1% who were 65 years of age or older. The median age was 40 years. For every 100 females, there were 89.4 males. For every 100 females age 18 and over, there were 86.7 males.

The median income for a household in the city was $45,926, and the median income for a family was $55,713. Males had a median income of $40,192 versus $23,176 for females. The per capita income for the city was $23,452. About 3.0% of families and 5.1% of the population were below the poverty line, including 6.6% of those under age 18 and 8.9% of those age 65 or over.

References

Cities in Indiana
Cities in Dearborn County, Indiana
Populated places established in 1852
1852 establishments in Indiana